Sôhachi might refer to two species of flatfish from the family Pleuronectidae: 

Cleisthenes herzensteini
Cleisthenes pinetorum